The Grenaa Line is a  long standard gauge single track railway line in Denmark which runs between Aarhus and Grenaa through the peninsula of Djursland. The railway opened in 1876–1877. It is owned and maintained by Rail Net Denmark and served with passenger trains by the Danish State Railways (DSB). It now functions as a commuter rail service in the Aarhus area and carries 1 million passengers annually.

History 

The section from Ryomgård to Grenaa was opened in 1876 together with the Randers-Ryomgaard Line. The section from Aarhus to Ryomgaard was opened in 1877. The two railways were operated by the joint operating company Østjyske Jernbane (ØJJ). Both lines were taken over by the Danish State Railways in 1885. Passenger traffic on the Randers-Ryomgaard Line ceased in 1971.

The Grenaa Line was around 2006 upgraded to support higher speeds. In 2012, eight new Siemens Desiro diesel trains started operation here and on the Odder Line, under the brand name Aarhus Commuter Rail.

Stations
Grenaa station
Trustrup station
Kolind station
Ryomgård station
Mørke station
Hornslet station
Løgten station
Skødstrup station
Hjortshøj station
Hovmarken railway halt
Lystrup station
Torsøvej station
Vestre Strandallé railway halt
Østbanetorvet station
Skolebakken railway halt
Aarhus Central Station

Previous stations 
Ålsø railway halt
Homå railway halt
Hallendrup railway halt
Koed railway halt
Thorsager station
Risskov station
Den Permanente railway halt
Europaplads railway halt

Future propositions 
The line is currently being adapted for the Aarhus Light Rail, an electric tram-train service scheduled for opening in 2017, but the Grenaa Line in 2018.

References

External links 

 Banedanmark
 DSB
 Aarhus Letbane

Railway lines in Denmark
Railway lines opened in 1876
Railway lines opened in 1877
1876 establishments in Denmark
1877 establishments in Denmark
Rail transport in the Central Denmark Region